The Quitsato Sundial is a cultural-tourist place located at La Mitad Del Mundo, near to Cayambe, 47 km north of Quito, Ecuador. It was built in 2006 and inaugurated in 2007 as an independent, non-profit project in a 24,756 ft² (2300 m²) area. Its main goal is to share crucial aspects of the astronomical knowledge of the prehispanic cultures of the region. The expositions are carried out by community members as a self-sustaining project.

Structure 
It consists of a circular platform of 54 m (177.64 ft) in diameter which forms a mosaic of light and dark pebbles drawing an eight-pointed star that indicates the solstices and equinoxes, plus intermediate lines pointing to the cardinal directions. In the center of this platform there is a 10 m (32.80 ft) high, 1.30 m (4.27 ft) diameter cylindrical orange tube which serves as a gnomon, pointing to the corresponding hours and months of the year in the platform according to the shadow cast by the Sun. The  gnomon represents the  metric system, based in the meter, which in its origin was intended to equal one ten-millionth of the quadrant of the Earth's circumference. The purpose of the color difference between the stones, apart from showing equinox and solstice lines, is to explain the meaning of albedo and its use in astronomical study. The Equator line is drawn by using smaller, darker pebbles between two metal plates.

The angles that form the geometric design of the eight-pointed star are given by the tilt of the Earth with respect to the ecliptic of the Earth, thus the platform itself also presents a reading of the celestial mechanics. Detailed positions of the solstices and equinoxes, as well as their respective axes, are presented.

The Ecuadorian Military Geographic Institute has placed two cylinders surrounded by concrete on a platform on top of the Equatorial line, with a 1 mm error margin determined by using GPS and GNSS equipment.

References

External links 
 Quitsato Sundial's website.

Buildings and structures in Pichincha Province
Sundials
Tourist attractions in Pichincha Province
Equator monuments
2006 establishments in Ecuador